tip is a Unix utility for establishing a terminal connection to a remote system via a modem. It is commonly associated with BSD Unix, as well as other UNIX operating systems such as Sun's Solaris. It was originally included with 4.2BSD.
The name may refer to ARPANET's Terminal Interface Processor (TIP),
a variant of the IMP, used to connect serial terminals directly with ARPANET.

tip is referred to in the Solaris documentation as the preferred terminal emulator to connect to a Sun workstation's serial port for maintenance purposes, for example, to configure the OpenPROM firmware.

Basics
tip is one of the commands referenced in the expect reference book by Don Libes.

The tip command line options are as follows:

tip [-v] [-speed-entry] (<hostname> | <phone-number> | <device>)

Use ~. to exit.
Use ~# to break (Stop-A on a Sun keyboard).
Use ~? to list all commands.

Examples
This Expect script is a simple example that establishes a terminal session:

spawn tip modem
expect "connected"
send "ATD$argc\r"
set timeout 30
expect "CONNECT"

As tip does not have the built-in logging capabilities that Minicom has, we need to use some other means to record the session. One way is to use script:

$ script -a install.log
Script started, file is install.log
$ tip hardwire
[tip session takes place.]
$ exit
Script done, file is install.log
$

and so on. In the above example, run on a Sun SPARC 20 workstation running Solaris 9, we first created a log file called install.log in the current directory using script' and then tell tip to use serial port B.

See also
 cu (Unix utility), a similar command

References

External links
 NetBSD source to tip

Unix software
Communication software
Terminal emulators